Fulgenzio Arminio Monforte, O.S.B. (1620–1680) was a Roman Catholic prelate who served as Bishop of Nusco (1669–1680).

Biography
Fulgenzio Arminio Monforte was born in Avellino, Italy in 1620 and ordained a priest in the Order of Saint Benedict.
On 1 April 1669, he was appointed during the papacy of Pope Clement IX as Bishop of Nusco.
On 7 April 1669, he was consecrated bishop by Francesco Maria Brancaccio, Cardinal-Bishop of Frascati, wit Stefano Brancaccio, Titular Archbishop of Hadrianopolis in Haemimonto, and Emmanuele Brancaccio, Bishop of Ariano, serving as co-consecrators. 
He served as Bishop of Nusco until his death in 1680.

Episcopal succession
While bishop, he was the principal co-consecrator of: 
Giuseppe Armenj (Armenio), Bishop of Teramo (1670); and
Henri Provana, Bishop of Nice (1671).

References

External links and additional sources
 (for Chronology of Bishops) 
 (for Chronology of Bishops) 

17th-century Italian Roman Catholic bishops
Bishops appointed by Pope Clement IX
1620 births
1680 deaths
People from Avellino
Benedictine bishops